Saintigny is a commune in the Eure-et-Loir department in northern France. It was established on 1 January 2019 by merger of the former communes of Saint-Denis-d'Authou (the seat) and Frétigny.

See also
Communes of the Eure-et-Loir department

References

Communes of Eure-et-Loir